Escoville is a commune in the Calvados department in the Normandy region in northwestern France, with a population of 803 people as of 2017.

Population

Geography
Escoville is located 5 kilometers north of Troarn, 11 kilometers northeast of Caen, 14 kilometers south of Cabourg, and 35 kilometers from Deauville. Escoville is part of the urban area of Caen.

Typonymy
The name of the locality is attested under the name Escoldivilla in 1109, Ecovilla in 1128, and Escoville in 1208.

Albert Dauzat and his successor, Ernest Nègre, consider that the first unit Escold- represents the Germanic personal name Ascald(us), also written as Ascolt.

Note: the evolution As- > Es- is not certified in the old forms. Perhaps there should be a recourse to an Anglo-Scandinavian anthroponym Skoldr/Skoldi? The prefix -esc results more often from the regular evolution of sk-. A similar processus is found, for example, in the word école, the French word for “school” (Old French escole < Latin scola).

The name (E)scoville has evolved into the English last names Scoville, Scovill, Scoffield, Schofield, and Scourfield.

See also
Communes of the Calvados department

References

External links

Official site

Communes of Calvados (department)
Calvados communes articles needing translation from French Wikipedia